The AN/APG-66 radar is a solid state medium range (up to 150 km) pulse-Doppler planar array radar originally designed by the Westinghouse Electric Corporation (now Northrop Grumman) for use in the F-16 Fighting Falcon.  This radar was employed in all domestic and export versions of the F-16 A/B models throughout the production.  Subsequent upgrades have been installed in many varying aircraft types, including the U.S. Customs and Border Protection's C-550 Cessna Citation, US Navy P-3 Orion, and Piper PA-42 Cheyenne II's, as well as the Small Aerostat Surveillance System (SASS).  Primary air-combat mode is look-down. In that mode, the AN/APG-66 can detect a fighter-size plane at a range of 34.5 Nautical miles (55.6 kilometers). Four modes are available in air-to-air combat. In dogfight mode, the radar scans a 20 degrees x 20 degrees field. In high-g maneuvers, it scans a 40 degrees x10 degrees pattern.
The radar system consists of the following line-replaceable units:
 Antenna
 Transmitter
 Low-power radio frequency
 Digital signal processor
 Radar computer

Specifications
 Frequency: 6.2 to 10.9 GHz
 Search cone: 120 degrees × 120 degrees
 Azimuth angular coverage: ±10 degrees / ± 30 degrees / ± 60 degrees 
 Weight: 98 to 135 kg depending on configuration
 Volume: 0.08 m³ to 0.102 m³ depending on configuration

Variants
 APG-66(V) – Employed in select US Navy P-3 Orion aircraft as part of a Counter Drug Update (CDU) for Counter-narcotics (CN) surveillance and interdiction operations in support of USCG

 APG-66(T47) – installed in Cessna OT-47B.
 APG-66(V)2 – upgrade of base radar developed for the F-16 Fighting Falcon Block 15 Mid Life Update program. New signal processor, higher output power, improved reliability. Range in clutter/jamming environment increased to 83 km.
 ARG-1  AN/APG-66(V)2 downgraded variant of the APG-66 , designed for the Argentine Air Force A-4AR Fightinghawk 
APG-66(V)2A –  AN/APG-66(V)2 with a new combined signal and data processor that provides seven times the speed and 20 times the memory of the older radar computer and digital signal processor line replaceable units. In this new variant, the displayed resolution in ground-mapping mode is quadrupled, and is reported to be close to that offered by SAR techniques. Used for modernization of F-16A/B fleet of Belgium, Denmark, Norway, Portugal and the Netherlands in the mid-1990s.
 APG-66(V)3 – as APG-66(V)2 but with CW illumination capability, export to Taiwan.
 APG-66(V)X – improved version of the APG-66(V)2/3 radar with greater detection range.
 APG-66H – installed on BAE Hawk 200 aircraft, smaller antenna, giving slightly reduced capabilities.
 APG-66J – configured for the Japanese F-4EJ upgrade program.
 APG-66NT – installed on US Navy T-39N aircraft for instruction of Student Naval Flight Officers.
 APG-66NZ – installed under the Project KAHU on New Zealands A-4 Skyhawk aircraft.
 APG-66SR
 APG-66SS 
 APG-66T – multi-target track while scan variant.
 APQ-164 – designed for the US Air Force B-1 Lancer bomber, with a passive electronically scanned array.

References

Aircraft radars
Military radars of the United States
Northrop Grumman radars
Radars of the United States Air Force
Equipment of the United States Coast Guard
Military electronics of the United States